HMS Juno was a 32-gun Richmond-class fifth-rate frigate of the Royal Navy.  She was launched in 1757 and served throughout the American Revolutionary War until scuttled in 1778 to avoid capture. She engaged  during Providences escape from Providence, Rhode Island 30 April 1778.

References 

 Robert Gardiner, The First Frigates, Conway Maritime Press, London 1992. .
 David Lyon, The Sailing Navy List, Conway Maritime Press, London 1993. .
 Rif Winfield, British Warships in the Age of Sail, 1714 to 1792, Seaforth Publishing, London 2007. .

Fifth-rate frigates of the Royal Navy
1757 ships
Ships built on the River Thames